Motion is a free software CCTV software application developed for Linux. It uses Video4Linux and its output can be JPEG, Netpbm files, or MPEG video sequences. It is strictly command line driven and can run as a daemon with a rather small footprint and low CPU usage.

It is operated mainly via config files, though the end video streams can be viewed from a web browser.
It can also call to user configurable "triggers" when certain events occur. Starting with version 4.2, the motion daemon supports encryption with Transport Layer Security.

See also 
ZoneMinder
Closed-circuit television (CCTV)

References

External links 
 
An Introduction to Video Surveillance with 'Motion': small tutorial for Debian users

Surveillance
Linux software

Free software programmed in C
Video surveillance
Software using the GPL license